Siobhán Killeen (born 21 September 1995) is a Republic of Ireland  women's international footballer. She has also played for UCD, Raheny United and Shelbourne Ladies. In 2010, she was a member of the Republic of Ireland U-17 squad that were runners-up in the 2010 UEFA Women's Under-17 Championship and quarter-finalists in the 2010 FIFA U-17 Women's World Cup.

Early years and education
Killeen grew up in the Maywood district of Raheny. As a schoolgirl she played both association football and Ladies' Gaelic football. Killeen studied Radiography at University College Dublin

Association football

UCD
While attending University College Dublin, Killeen represented the women's association football team at intervarsity level, playing in teams alongside Ciara Grant, Dora Gorman and Julie-Ann Russell. In 2013–14  Killeen was a member of the UCD team that won the WSCAI Futsal Cup, defeating the holders, I.T. Sligo, 3–2 in the final at the Mardyke Arena. She also helped UCD win the WSCAI Premier Division.

Raheny United
As a schoolgirl Killeen played association football with Raheny United.
While attending UCD, Killeen and Ciara Grant also played for Raheny United in the Women's National League. Killeen and Grant helped United win two successive league titles in 2012–13 and 2013–14. Killeen also helped United win three successive FAI Women's Cup between 2012 and 2014.
In the 2014 final Killeen scored the winner in a 2–1 extra time win over UCD Waves. Killeen also helped United win the 2015 WNL Cup and also represented the club in both the 2013–14 and the 2014–15 UEFA Women's Champions League campaigns.

Shelbourne Ladies
During the 2015–16 Women's National League season, Killeen played with Shelbourne Ladies, helping them finish as runners-up in the FAI Women's Cup, the WNL Shield and the Women's National League. Shelbourne Ladies did manage to win the WNL Cup. In the final Killeen provided the assist that saw Leanne Kiernan clinch a 3–2 win over UCD Waves. In the 2016 FAI Women's Cup, Killeen helped Shelbourne to a 5–0 win over Wexford Youths. Just before the 2018 Women's National League season, Killeen decided to stop playing soccer, in favour of Gaelic football.

Republic of Ireland international
Killeen has represented the Republic of Ireland at under-17, under-19, university and senior level. In 2010, together with Megan Campbell, Dora Gorman, Denise O'Sullivan, Ciara Grant and  Clare Shine, she was a member of the Republic of Ireland U-17 squad that were runners-up in the 2010 UEFA Women's Under-17 Championship and quarter-finalists in the 2010 FIFA U-17 Women's World Cup. Killeen made her senior debut against New Zealand at the 2014 Cyprus Cup. She has subsequently represented the Republic of Ireland in their 2015 FIFA Women's World Cup and UEFA Women's Euro 2017 qualifying campaigns. Killeen also represented Ireland at the 2013 and 2015 Summer Universiades.

Ladies' Gaelic football

Club level
As a schoolgirl Killeen played Ladies' Gaelic football with Scoil Uí Chonaill CLG and Raheny GAA. At senior level she has also played for Clontarf GAA.

Inter-county
Killeen has represented  at various levels. In the semi-final against , Killeen came on as a substitute and scored 2–0 and provided two goal assists for Lauren Ebbs. In 2018 Killeen  played for the senior Dublin team in the Ladies' National Football League.

Personal life
Killeen is the partner of Pearl Slattery, the Shelbourne player.

On 26 March 2020, Killeen announced she was COVID-19 positive. She returned to work in April and was reported to have recovered. In June, she sat alongside Chief Medical Officer Tony Holohan and spoke about her experience at the daily Department of Health press briefing. She contradicted the earlier suggestion that she had overcome the illness when saying she was "still on the long road to full recovery".

Honours

Association football
Individual
Women's National League Team of the Season 
 2015–16
Raheny United
 Women's National League
Winners: 2012–13, 2013–14 : 2
Runners-up: 2011–12: 1
FAI Women's Cup
Winners: 2012, 2013, 2014: 3
WNL Cup
Winners: 2015: 1
Shelbourne Ladies
FAI Women's Cup
Winners: 2016: 1
Runners-up: 2015: 1
WNL Cup
Winners: 2016
Women's National League
Runners-up: 2015–16
WNL Shield
Runners-up: 2015
UCD
WSCAI Premier Division
Winners: 2013–14 
WSCAI Futsal Cup
Winners: 2014
Republic of Ireland U-17 
UEFA Women's Under-17 Championship
Runner Up: 2010

Gaelic football

All-Ireland Under-18 Ladies' Football Championship
Runner Up: 2011

References

External links

1993 births
Living people
Alumni of University College Dublin
Association footballers from County Dublin
Republic of Ireland women's association footballers
Republic of Ireland women's futsal players
Republic of Ireland women's international footballers
Women's association football midfielders
Women's National League (Ireland) players
Raheny United F.C. players
Shelbourne F.C. (women) players
UCD Women's Soccer Club players
Dublin inter-county ladies' footballers
Ladies' Gaelic footballers who switched code
LGBT Gaelic footballers
Irish LGBT sportspeople
Raheny GAA footballers
Republic of Ireland women's youth international footballers